The 35th government of Turkey (22 May 1972 – 15 April 1973) was a government in the history of Turkey. It is also called the Melen government.

Background 
After Nihat Erim, the prime minister of the previous government, resigned, President Cevdet Sunay appointed Ferit Melen, the minister of National Defence in the previous government, as the prime minister. Ferit Melen was a member of National Reliance Party (MGP), a small party in the parliament, but his government had the support of the two major parties, Republican People's Party (CHP) and Justice Party (AP). The Melen government lineup was similar to the previous government's.

The government

Aftermath
On 6 April 1973, Fahri Korutürk was elected as the new president of Turkey. As political tradition dictated, Ferit Melen resigned on the next day. The next government was founded by Naim Talu, the Minister of Commerce in the Melen government.

References

Cabinets of Turkey
1972 establishments in Turkey
1973 disestablishments in Turkey
Cabinets established in 1972
Cabinets disestablished in 1973
Coalition governments of Turkey
Members of the 35th government of Turkey
14th parliament of Turkey
Republican Reliance Party